Serengeti District is one of the seven districts of Mara Region of Tanzania. Its administrative centre is the town of Mugumu. It is home to part of the world-famous Serengeti National Park a UNESCO World Heritage Site and contains one of the western gates to the park.

According to the 2012 Tanzania National Census, the population of Serengeti District was 249,420.

Transport
There are no paved roads connecting Serengeti District with the rest of the country. The unpaved trunk road T17 from Musoma to Arusha passes through the district from west to east.

Administrative subdivisions
As of 2012, Serengeti District was administratively divided into 28 wards.

Wards

 Busawe
 Geitasamo
 Ikoma
 Issenye
 Kebanchabancha
 Kenyamonta
 Kisaka
 Kisangura
 Kyambahi
 Machochwe
 Magange
 Majimoto
 Manchira
 Mbalibali
 Morotonga
 Mosongo
 Mugumu
 Natta
 Nyamatare
 Nyambureti
 Nyamoko
 Nyansurura
 Rigicha
 Ring'wani
 Rung'abure
 Sedeco
 Stendi Kuu
 Uwanja wa Ndege

References

Districts of Mara Region